Obeth Mbuipaha Kandjoze (born 9 August 9, 1966 in Windhoek) is a Namibian politician of the ruling SWAPO Party. He is Namibia's director-general of the National Planning Commission and Minister of Economic Planning.

Kandjoze holds a Master of Science degree in geology from the University of Helsinki, Finland, a Bachelor of Science degree, also in geology, from the University of Cape Town. He has worked for the National Petroleum Corporation of Namibia since 1999 and was its CEO from 2012.

Kandjoze was appointed Minister of Mines and Energy by president Hage Geingob in 2015. In a cabinet reshuffle in February 2018 he swapped positions with Tom Alweendo and is since the director-general of the National Planning Commission and Minister of Economic Planning.

References

1966 births
Living people
Namibian businesspeople
People from Khomas Region
Herero people
SWAPO politicians
Mines and energy ministers of Namibia
Directors-general of the National Planning Commission of Namibia
Members of the National Assembly (Namibia)
University of Cape Town alumni
University of Helsinki alumni